Martin Gustavsson (born November 5, 1980) is a breaststroke swimmer from Sweden. In 2003 he won the silver medal in the 4×50 m medley relay at the European Short Course Championships in Dublin, Ireland, alongside Jens Petersson, Björn Lundin and Stefan Nystrand.  He competed in both the 2000 and 2004 Summer Olympics

Clubs
Malmö KK

References

1980 births
Living people
Swimmers at the 2000 Summer Olympics
Swimmers at the 2004 Summer Olympics
Olympic swimmers of Sweden
European Aquatics Championships medalists in swimming
Malmö KK swimmers
Swedish male breaststroke swimmers